Artist vs. Poet is an American power pop band, formed in Dallas, Texas in late 2007. The band has released six studio albums, five extended plays, ten singles, and five music videos.

Artist vs. Poet released their first extended play through Arsenal Records, Alive Once Again on May 13, 2008. On November 18, 2008, they released their self-titled extended play through Fearless Records. The third extended play produced one music video. From then on, Artist vs. Poet released a fourth extended play, Damn Rough Night (Fearless Records) on December 14, 2009. Favorite Fix (Fearless Records) was released on March 2, 2010, this was the band's first studio album. Departing from Fearless Records, the band released their fifth extended play, Naughty Or Nice, online on a "pay what you want" donation box.

Albums

Studio albums

Extended plays

Featured albums

Singles

Music videos

References

Discographies of American artists